Clark's Island is the name of a small island located in Duxbury Bay in the U.S. state of Massachusetts.  It was named for John Clark, the first mate of the Mayflower, the ship that brought the Pilgrims to New England. The island was initially considered for the location of the Pilgrim's settlement, but was rejected in favor of a site to the south, which became known as Plymouth, Massachusetts.  Today Clark's Island is a part of the town of Plymouth.

Location

Clark's Island is located in Duxbury Bay. Although physically closer to the town of Duxbury, the island is officially part of the town of Plymouth, as are the outermost points of Duxbury Beach, Saquish Neck and Gurnet Point. The island is located north of the Duxbury Pier Light (locally known as "Bug Light") and Saquish Neck, and west of Saquish Head.

References

External links
Map of Plymouth Bay showing Clark's Island

Coastal islands of Massachusetts
Plymouth, Massachusetts
Islands of Plymouth County, Massachusetts